Elections to Folkestone & Hythe District Council were held on 2 May 2019.

Summary

Election result

|-

Ward results

Broadmead

Cheriton

East Folkestone

 
 
 
 
 
 
 
 

 
Dylan Jeffrey stood as a Labour candidate in 2015, and Carol Sacre stood as a UKIP candidate.

Folkestone Central

 
 
 
 
 
 
 
 
 

 
David Horton stood as a Green candidate in 2015.

Folkestone Harbour

 
 
 
 
 
 

 
Ray Field stood as a TUSC candidate in 2015, and Mary Lawes stood as a UKIP candidate.

Hythe

Hythe Rural

New Romney

North Downs East

North Downs West

Sandgate and West Folkestone

Romney Marsh

Walland and Denge Marsh

References

2019 English local elections
Folkestone and Hythe District Council elections
Folkestone and Hythe District